Thomas Horne (8 June 1800 – 23 September 1870) was an Australian judge and politician.

Early life
Horne was born in Chiswick, Middlesex and educated at Westminster School and Christ Church, Oxford. He entered Lincoln's Inn and was called to the Bar in February 1827. He married Maria Hyriott in 1826.

Arrival in the colony
Horne travelled to Van Diemen's Land with his wife and two daughters, arriving in Hobart Town on 31 January 1830. He was soon engaged in local politics, opposing the governor, Sir George Arthur and editing the Colonist newspaper.

Horne's life was marked by frequent descent into debt. At one point he admitted to losses of £22,000.

Legal career
He became Solicitor-General in January 1841, and acted as Attorney-General from July to November of that year. He became Attorney-General in March 1844, and in January 1848 was appointed as puisne judge to the Supreme Court of Tasmania. This appointment attracted criticism from the press due to Horne's financial history, and was unsuccessfully challenged in the Supreme Court. When Sir John Pedder retired as Chief Justice, the Lieutenant Governor, Sir William Denison, recommended Valentine Fleming over Horne, arguing that the instability in Horne's finances made him an unsuitable candidate for the position.

Political career
Horne was elected to the Legislative Council as member for Hobart, along with William Carter and James Milne Wilson. In January 1857 a special Act was passed to enable Horne to act as both a judge and an unsalaried President of the Legislative Council.

In 1861 Horne was elected to the House of Assembly as a representative of Hobart Town. He served in the House of Assembly until 1866.

See also
List of Judges of the Supreme Court of Tasmania

References

1800 births
1870 deaths
People from Chiswick
People educated at Westminster School, London
Alumni of Christ Church, Oxford
Presidents of the Tasmanian Legislative Council
Members of the Tasmanian House of Assembly
Judges of the Supreme Court of Tasmania
Attorneys-General of Tasmania
Solicitors-General of Tasmania
Australian newspaper editors
Politicians from Hobart
Members of Lincoln's Inn
19th-century British journalists
British male journalists
19th-century British male writers
19th-century British writers
Van Diemen's Land judges
Colony of Tasmania judges
19th-century Australian politicians
19th-century Australian judges
English emigrants to colonial Australia